Kochman is a surname. Notable persons with that name include:
Cary Kochman (born 1965), American businessman
Charles Kochman, American editor known for having purchased the book rights to Diary of a Wimpy Kid
 Li Kochman (born 1995), Israeli judoka
Roger Kochman (born  1941), American football player